The commune of Buganda is a commune of Cibitoke Province in north-western Burundi. The capital lies at Buganda.

References

Communes of Burundi
Cibitoke Province